Bokra Sharif is a village in Gujar Khan, Punjab, Pakistan, its geographical coordinates are 33.148489 N, 73.238060 E and its original name (with diacritics) is Bokra.

Location
Bokra (33.148489 N, 73.238060 E) is a small village in the vicinity of Sasral. It is located in Punjab, District: Rawalpindi and Tehsil: Gujarkhan, Pakistan.

Population
The approximate population of this village is 6500, as there are around 1000 houses with each family consisting of 5 to 7 people.

Language
The language frequently spoken by the native villagers is Potohari. The language spoken other than this is Urdu.

Culture
Natives celebrate different events like the rest, e.g.: Eid, Weddings, and fairs. The fairs occur in the nearby village like (Mian Mohra and Khanyal) where they have different stalls, horse riding, and kabadi. There once was a unique ritual in which they celebrate the completion of bamboo mats but now it’s not practiced anymore.

Shrine
A structure or place memorializing a person or religious concept.
Ziārat Pīr Mohr Ali Shah (8.1 km)

Hill
A rounded elevation of limited extent rising above the surrounding land with local relief of less than 300m.
One Tree Hill (5.3 km) and Mira Dhok (5.6 km)

Source of income
Most of the people have joined forces as officers and soldiers. This land has produced politicians and officers including Farzana Raja, Javed Akhtar, Khawaja Nadir Pervez, Air Marshal Anwar Shameem and ormer Prime Minister Raja Pervaiz Ashraf. Some people have their small shops and follow the occupation as mechanics and carpenter. currently 3 major markets/commercial area/shops in the village. Bokra has a cemetery, two mosques and a hospital at a distance of 1 km.

Health
Bokra have all basic health facilities. There is a private hospital Azhar Hospital and a Government Hospital. Azhar Hospital has been providing the facilities of X-Ray, ECG, Ultrasound, Laboratory and also have a Pharmacy.

References

Rawalpindi District